Abdullah Muhammad Mukwaya is a Ugandan teacher and religious leader who is the current District Qadi of Mbarara District under the Ankole-Kigezi region.

Career

Qadi: 2019–present 
He was inaugurated into power on 24 April 2019 in the attendance of the President of Uganda, Yoweri Kaguta Museveni as chief guest of the ceremony and the Supreme Mufti of Uganda, Sheikh Shaban Mubajje. The president also laid a foundation stone for a multi-billion Supreme General Hospital, a new project in Mbarara Municipality that is being undertaken by Muslims in Mbarara district. The president also gifted the Mukwaya with a brand new car. The inauguration was led by Sheikh Ahmed Nyago, the chairman of the Uganda Muslim Supreme Council electoral commission.

Mukwaya replaced Shiekh Ahamed Siraj Kwikiriza who died in a motor accident in September 2017 at Independence Park on his way to lead Eid-Adhah prayers at Abubakar Mosque in Kakoba division.

Personal life
Mukwaya is the father of film director and screenwriter Usama Mukwaya.

References 

Sharia judges
Ugandan Muslims
Usama Mukwaya
Islam in Uganda
Ugandan Islamic religious leaders
Year of birth missing (living people)
Living people